Mitchel Musso is the debut album by Mitchel Musso. The album was released under Walt Disney Records on June 2, 2009.

Background 
Musso worked with Sam Hollander, Dave Katz, Bryan Todd, Justin Gray, Curt Schneider, Matthew Wilder, and other producers and songwriters to produce the album in both Los Angeles and New York. Musso himself also contributed co-writing on two songs of the album's thirteen tracks. Mitchel sings solo on all of the tracks except two titled "Us Against the World" and "Shout It". The two are a duet featuring singer Katelyn Tarver and Musso's brother Mason Musso respectively. Musso stated: "But actually my favorite song off my album is a duet, "Us Against the World" and it's my favorite song. I feel like it's got the most uh, it's kind of a dark vibe but at the same time it's a really upbeat like uh, I would say a happy song. And I think the girls voice, her name's Katelyn Tarver, so it was awesome getting her on the track." "Let's Make This Last 4Ever" was featured on an episode of Hannah Montana and is also a track on the Hannah Montana 3 soundtrack. "Hey" was used as the theme song to Unhitched.

Release 
The album was released on June 2, 2009. The physical CD includes a fold-out poster of Musso. They also include an exclusive stream of "Let's Make This Last 4Ever", which will be available once the album is purchased.

Musso promoted the album by setting out on a summer tour with over 54 scheduled dates across the United States and Canada. The band KSM opened for him on a select number of dates. Musso also performed as the opening act for his older brother's band Metro Station on 9 dates between July 23 and August 14, 2009. Honor Society also opened for some of his shows. Musso promoted the album by performing three songs off the album at the Wango Tango music festival in Los Angeles on May 9, 2009.

Commercial performance
Katlyn:The Soundtrack debuted at number three on the US Billboard 200 and US Top Soundtracks chart with 126,000 units sold in its first week, becoming the biggest debut for a TV soundtrack in the year. It ended up in the 61st position on Billboard'''s list of top-selling albums of 2008 and charted for 46 weeks. The soundtrack was certified Gold in July 2008 and Platinum in March 2009 selling over 1 million units in the country. It also debuted at number nineteen on the Canadian Albums and received a Gold certification in the same year. The soundtrack charted outside of the United States in Australia, Norway, Germany, United Kingdom.

 Singles 
"Hey" was released as lead single from the album. Musso filmed a music video for the song and the video premiered on Disney Channel on May 15, 2009. The song debuted at number 70 on the Billboard'' Hot 100.

"Shout It" was announced as a single by Musso in his official Twitter page. The music video for the song, which features scenes from his tour, was released on September 29, 2009, on iTunes.

Other songs
"The in Crowd" was released as a promotional single on December 5, 2008. A music video was launched on Disney Channel in early March.

Track listing

Exclusive packages 
Physical CD
 Fold out poster of Musso
 CD unlocks an exclusive stream of the song "Let's Make This Last 4Ever"

Other recorded tracks 
 "Leavin'"
 "Let's Go"
 "Wasn't Your Girlfriend"
 "White Striped Gloves"

Charts 
In its first week of release the album sold 20,000 units, which put it at #19 on the Billboard 200. As of August 2009, the album has sold over 100,000 copies in the U.S.

International release 
The album was released in the UK on August 24 and in Spain released on August 25. Residents in the UK could listen to full tracks from the album until August 31 on Disney My Page.

Personnel 

 Dwight A. Baker - Drums, Engineer
 James Bourne - Vocals (background)
 Alex Bush - Engineer
 Andreas Carlsson - Guitar
 Randy Cooke - Drums
 Simon Curtis - Vocals (background)
 Eddie Galan -  Producer, Vocals (background)
 Steven "Stizzle" Schneider - Co-Producer, Programming
 Steve Gerdes - Art Direction, Design
 Jason Gleed - Producer
 Taylor Harris - Vocal Editing
 David Krauklis - Drums
 Kenny Livingston - Drums
 Gavin MacKillop - Engineer
 Brian Malouf - Executive Producer, Mixing
 Stephen Marcussen - Mastering
 Mason Musso - Vocals (background)
 Mitchel Musso - Vocals (lead & background)
 Tim Pagnotta - Guitar, Keyboards, Producer, Engineer
 Brett Rosenberg - Guitar
 Curt Schneider - Synthesizer, Bass, Producer, Engineer, Mixing
 Blair Sinta - Drums
 Greg Suran - Bass, Guitar, Engineer
 Gavin Taylor - Design
 Ali "Dee" Theodore - Producer
 Bryan Todd - Programming, Producer, Engineer, Mixing
 Graham Ward - Drums
 Bruce Watson - Guitar

References

External links
 Official Website
 Mitchel Musso at Walt Disney Records

2009 debut albums
Walt Disney Records albums
Mitchel Musso albums